Ultimate Hustler was an American reality show broadcast on Black Entertainment Television created by Datari Turner. The show featured Damon Dash training 16 aspiring entrepreneurs, both men and women, who compete for an executive position to work for Damon Dash. Based on its premise, the show has been described as a hip-hop version of The Apprentice.

Lifetime 
The program was first broadcast on October 4, 2005, with the final episode on December 13, 2005, with Brian Rikuda winning the top prize.

Hustlers
 Jennifer Bayer
 Christopher C.
Matthew McGreevy
 Laurence Chandler
 Tichanda Daniels
 Shola Adisa-Farrar
 Ray Freeman
 Kwame Gates
 Jermel H.,  "Sharp"
 Will L.
 Brian Rikuda (Winner) 
 Dashawn Taylor
 Kira Vince 
 Dominic Sauer
 Alphonzo Terrell
 Ashley Williams
 Tarisha Brown, a.k.a. "Seven"

References 

BET original programming
2005 American television series debuts
2005 American television series endings
2000s American reality television series